This is a list of ports and harbours of the Indian Ocean.

External links 

 Lloyd's List - 

Indian Ocean